Frederick Weller (born April 18, 1966) is an American actor known for portraying Johnny Sandowski on Missing Persons, Shane Mungitt in Take Me Out and Marshall Mann on In Plain Sight.

Early life
Weller was born in New Orleans, Louisiana, the son of lawyers Carole (died 2017) and Francis Weller (1922–2018). He is a 1984 graduate of Jesuit High School, a Catholic all-boys high school in New Orleans. He graduated summa cum laude from the University of North Carolina at Chapel Hill in 1988. He then studied acting at The Juilliard School as a member of the Drama Division's  (1988–1992).

Career 
In 1993, Weller was one of the main regulars in the TV series Missing Persons. He has made guest appearances in episodes of Law & Order, Law & Order: Special Victims Unit, Law & Order: Criminal Intent, Monk and The Young Indiana Jones Chronicles. He has also appeared in several well-received films, such as Stonewall, The Business of Strangers, The Shape of Things, and the 2000 drama/miniseries The Beach Boys: An American Family portraying the character Brian Wilson.

He was initially successful as a stage actor, and stage acting is still his biggest passion. He has performed in Neil LaBute and David Mamet plays and films. He appeared on Broadway in 2003 in the Tony award-winning play Take Me Out in which he appeared completely nude, and in 2014 in the Terrence McNally play Mothers and Sons. In 2018 he appeared on Broadway as Bob Ewell in Aaron Sorkin's To Kill a Mockingbird, an adaptation of Harper Lee's novel.

Weller has also played lead roles in many successful independent films, including Neil LaBute's The Shape of Things (with Paul Rudd, Rachel Weisz and Gretchen Mol), James Toback's When Will I Be Loved (opposite Neve Campbell) and The Business of Strangers (with Stockard Channing and Julia Stiles).

He starred in the USA Network comedy-drama series In Plain Sight as Deputy U.S. Marshal Marshall Mann. He worked closely with Mary McCormack (Deputy U.S. Marshal Mary Shannon) during filming.

Personal life
Weller married actress Ali Marsh on September 6, 2003. They have two children, a daughter, Azalea, born in 2007, whose godmother is his In Plain Sight co-star Mary McCormack, and a son, Hank, born in 2010. He and his family live in the Greenwich Village neighborhood of New York City.

He is a cousin of actor Peter Weller.

Filmography

Film

Television

References

External links
 
 
 

1966 births
Living people
American male film actors
American male stage actors
American male television actors
Juilliard School alumni
Male actors from New Orleans
University of North Carolina at Chapel Hill alumni
20th-century American male actors
21st-century American male actors